The Professional Girl Wrestling Association (PGWA) is an America women's professional wrestling promotion. The aim of the PGWA is to preserve and promote "Old School" Women's professional wrestling. Based in North Carolina, the organization frequently sponsors matches and whole cards in the Mid-Atlantic and Mid-South states, as well as in Mexico and the United Kingdom through partnerships with other regional promotions. From its founding in 1992 until her death in mid-2008, the Commissioner of the PGWA was Penny Banner.

Purpose
The company sets up wrestling matches for independent female wrestlers—wrestlers that are not signed to a major company—video tapes the matches and sells them to help promote their careers. Because the women do not sign exclusive contracts, they are free to wrestle in other promotions or major wrestling companies. Unlike many female-only wrestling organizations, PGWA does not overly emphasize the sexuality of the female wrestlers, nor does it promote them as "eye-candy", but rather stresses their skills and ability.

PGWA matches tend to run 15 to 30 minutes, as opposed to the usual 5 to 10 minutes often allotted female wrestlers by promoters.  This allows wrestlers to display a full range of their abilities, rather than having to focus on a few key moves in the short span of time their match allows.

History
The Professional Girl Wrestling Association (PGWA) was founded in 1992 in North Carolina by sportswriter Tom Randolph. Randolph brought a video camera to one of Susan Green's training sessions and later videotaped a match between her and Judy Martin. Green later became the promotion's first champion.

In 2002, the promotion began holding events in the United Kingdom and Europe. The 2004 show "Summer Heat", filmed in Nashville, Tennessee, had the largest card in the promotion's history to that time with 16 women wrestling at the event. In October 2004, PGWA co-promoted the first ChickFight tournament, which later became an annual event, with All Pro Wrestling. In November 2008, after the death of Penny Banner, Susan Green became the new commissioner of the PGWA.

LadySports
Concurrent with the launch of the PGWA in 1992, the promotion began selling a women's wrestling newsletter called Connections.  Shortly, this was transformed into a quarterly magazine titled LadySports (3 issues of a sister magazine, LadyBoxer, were also published in the late 1990s).  The PGWA staff also frequently supplied photographs and feature articles to such newsstand publications as Wrestling Eye, PWI, WOW! and Fighting Females.  Since the mid-90s, a LadySports Online website has also been maintained.  With the cessation of the quarterly magazine, publishing efforts were shifted to the website, which not only offers downloads of PGWA matches and features on PGWA talent, but also provides coverage for non-PGWA women, from wrestlers to valets and referees.

PGWA Championship

Rookies of the Year
1994-Molly McShane
1995-Regina Hale
1996-Joanie Laurer/Lee (AKA Chyna)
1997-Brandi "Babydoll" Collins
1998-Strawberry Fields
1999-Sweet Destiny (AKA Little Jeanne)
2000-Amber Holly
2001-Mia Martinez
2002-Christie Ricci
2003-Venus
RotY retired
2019-Nikki Victory (RotY award revived)
2020-Elizabeth
2021-Kasey Fox
2022-Riley Matthews

See also

List of women's wrestling promotions

References

External links
LadySports Official Website
Pippa L'Vinn interview

Independent professional wrestling promotions based in North Carolina
Women's professional wrestling promotions
Women's sports in North Carolina